Oliver Barth (born 6 October 1979) is a German football coach and former player.

Coaching career
In January 2017, Barth joined VfB Stuttgart's coaching team. He became assistant coach of the club's second team playing in the Regionalliga, under his former SC Freiburg teammate Andreas Hinkel. 

On 1 July 2018, Barth joined Greuther Fürth as assistant coach to Damir Burić. In the first main round of the 2018–19 DFB-Pokal, Barth replaced Burić, who could not be there due to a bereavement in his family. In February 2019, the club sacked from Burić and Barth after the team lost 6–0 in SC Paderborn.

VfL Bochum strengthened head coach Robin Dutt's staff for the 2019–20 season with Barth as an additional assistant to enable the first assistant coach Heiko Butscher. Barth left the club on 4 January 2020.

References

External links
 

1979 births
Living people
German footballers
Footballers from Baden-Württemberg
Association football defenders
Stuttgarter Kickers players
Fortuna Düsseldorf players
SC Freiburg players
VfR Aalen players
Stuttgarter Kickers II players
Bundesliga players
2. Bundesliga players
3. Liga players
Regionalliga players